Vauxhall Bridge is a Grade II* listed steel and granite deck arch bridge in central London. It crosses the River Thames in a southeast–northwest direction between Vauxhall on the south bank and Pimlico on the north bank. Opened in 1906, it replaced an earlier bridge, originally known as Regent Bridge but later renamed Vauxhall Bridge, built between 1809 and 1816 as part of a scheme for redeveloping the south bank of the Thames. The bridge is built at a location in the river previously served by a ferry.

The building of both bridges was problematic, with both the first and second bridges requiring several redesigns from multiple architects. The original bridge, the first iron bridge over the Thames, was built by a private company and operated as a toll bridge before being taken into public ownership in 1879. The second bridge, which took eight years to build, was the first in London to carry trams and later one of the first two roads in London to have a bus lane.

In 1963 it was proposed to replace the bridge with a modern development containing seven floors of shops, office space, hotel rooms and leisure facilities supported above the river, but the plans were abandoned because of costs. With the exception of alterations to the road layout and the balustrade, the design and appearance of the current bridge has remained almost unchanged since 1907. The bridge today is an important part of London's road system and carries the A202 road and Cycle Superhighway 5 (CS5) across the Thames.

Background 
In the early 13th century, Anglo-Norman mercenary Falkes de Breauté built a manor house in the then empty marshlands of South Lambeth, across the River Thames from Westminster. In 1223–24, de Breauté and others revolted against Henry III; following a failed attempt to seize the Tower of London, de Breauté's lands in England were forfeited and he was forced into exile in France and later Rome. The lands surrounding his Lambeth manor house continued to be known as Falkes' Hall, later Vauxhall.

In 1806 a scheme was proposed by Ralph Dodd to open the south bank of the Thames for development, by building a new major road from Hyde Park Corner to Kennington and Greenwich, crossing the river upstream of the existing Westminster Bridge. The proprietors of Battersea Bridge, concerned about a potential loss of customers, petitioned Parliament against the scheme, stating that "[Dodd] is a well known adventurer and Speculist, and the projector of numerous undertakings upon a large scale most if not all of which have failed", and the bill was abandoned.

In 1809 a new bill was presented to Parliament, and the proprietors of Battersea Bridge agreed to allow it to pass and to accept compensation. The Bill incorporated the Vauxhall Bridge Company, allowing it to raise up to £300,000 (about £ in ) by means of mortgages or the sale of shares, and to keep all profits from any tolls raised. From these profits, the Vauxhall Bridge Company was obliged to compensate the proprietors of Battersea Bridge for any drop in revenue caused by the new bridge.

Old Vauxhall Bridge

Dodd submitted a scheme for a bridge at Vauxhall of 13 arches. However, soon after the 1809 Act was passed, he was dismissed by the Vauxhall Bridge Company and his design was abandoned. John Rennie was commissioned to design and build the new bridge, and a stone bridge of seven arches was approved. On 9 May 1811, Lord Dundas laid the foundation stone of the bridge on the northern bank.

The Vauxhall Bridge Company ran into financial difficulties and was unable to raise more than the £300,000 stipulated in the 1809 Act, and a new Act was passed in 1812 permitting the Company to build a cheaper iron bridge. Rennie submitted a new design for an iron bridge of eleven spans, costing far less than the original stone design. Rennie's design was rejected, and instead construction began on a nine arch iron bridge designed by Samuel Bentham. Concerns were raised about the construction of the piers, and engineer James Walker was appointed to inspect the work. Walker's report led to the design being abandoned for the second time, and Walker himself was appointed to design and build a bridge of nine  cast-iron arches with stone piers, the first iron bridge to be built across the Thames.

On 4 June 1816, over five years after construction began, the bridge opened, initially named Regent Bridge after George, Prince Regent, but shortly afterwards renamed Vauxhall Bridge. The developers failed to pay the agreed compensation to the owners of Battersea Bridge and were taken to court; after a legal dispute lasting five years a judgement was made in favour of Battersea Bridge, with Vauxhall Bridge being obliged to pay £8,234 (about £ in ) compensation. As well as the compensation awarded by the courts to Battersea Bridge in 1821, the 1809 Act also obliged the Vauxhall Bridge Company to pay compensation to the operators of Huntley Ferry, the Sunday ferry service to Vauxhall Gardens, with the level to be decided by "a jury of 24 honest, sufficient and indifferent men". The bridge cost £175,000 (about £ in ) to build; with the costs of approach roads and compensation payments, the total cost came to £297,000 (about £ in ).

Usage

In anticipation of the areas surrounding the bridge becoming prosperous suburbs, tolls were set at relatively high rates on a sliding scale, ranging from a penny for pedestrians to 2s 6d for vehicles drawn by six horses. Exemptions were granted for mail coaches, soldiers on duty and parliamentary candidates during election campaigns. However, the area around the bridge failed to develop as expected. In 1815 John Doulton built the Doulton & Watts (later Royal Doulton) stoneware factory at Vauxhall, and consequently instead of the wealthy residents anticipated by the company, the area began to fill with narrow streets of working class tenements to house the factory's workers. Meanwhile, the large Millbank Penitentiary was built near the northern end of the bridge, discouraging housing development. Consequently, toll revenues were initially lower than expected, and the dividends paid to investors were low.

Usage rose considerably in 1838 when the terminus of the London and South Western Railway was built at nearby Nine Elms. Nine Elms station proved inconvenient and unpopular with travellers, and in 1848 a new railway terminus was built  closer to central London, at Waterloo Bridge station (renamed "Waterloo Station" in 1886), and the terminus at Nine Elms was abandoned.

With the closure of the rail terminus, Vauxhall Bridge's main source of revenue was visitors to the Vauxhall Gardens pleasure park. In addition to people visiting the Gardens themselves, Vauxhall Gardens were used as a launch point for hot air balloon flights, and large crowds would gather on the bridge and surrounding streets to watch the flights. A large crowd also assembled on the bridge in September 1844 to watch Mister Barry, a clown from Astley's Amphitheatre, sail from Vauxhall Bridge to Westminster Bridge in a washtub towed by geese.

Public ownership
Despite early setbacks and the construction nearby in the 19th century of three competing bridges (Lambeth Bridge, Chelsea Bridge and Albert Bridge), the rapid urban growth of London made Vauxhall Bridge very profitable. The annual income from tolls rose from £4,977 (about £ in ) in its first full year of operation, to £62,392 in 1877 (about £ in ). In 1877 the Metropolis Toll Bridges Act was passed, allowing the Metropolitan Board of Works (MBW) to buy all London bridges between Hammersmith Bridge and Waterloo Bridge and free them from tolls.

In 1879 the bridge was bought by the MBW for £255,000 (about £ in ) and tolls on the bridge were lifted. Inspections of the bridge by the MBW following the purchase found that the two central piers were badly eroded, exposing the timber cradles on which the piers rested. Large quantities of cement in bags were laid around the wooden cradles as an emergency measure; however, the cement bags themselves soon washed away. The piers were removed, replaced by a single large central arch. By this time the bridge was in very poor condition, and in 1895 the London County Council (LCC), which had taken over from the MBW in 1889, sought and gained Parliamentary approval to replace the bridge. Permission was granted by Parliament to raise the projected replacement costs of £484,000 (about £ in ) from rates across the whole of London rather than only local residents, as a new bridge was considered to be of benefit to the whole of London.

In August 1898 a temporary wooden bridge was moved into place alongside the existing bridge, and the demolition of the old bridge began.

New Vauxhall Bridge

Sir Alexander Binnie, the resident engineer of the London County Council (LCC), submitted a design for a steel bridge, which proved unpopular. At the request of the LCC, Binnie submitted a new design for a bridge of five spans, to be built in concrete and faced with granite.

Work on Binnie's design began, but was beset by problems. Leading architects condemned the design, with Arthur Beresford Pite describing it as "a would-be Gothic architectural form of great vulgarity and stupid want of meaning", and T G Jackson describing the bridge designs as a sign of "the utter apparent indifference of those in authority to the matter of art". Plans to build large stone abutments had to be suspended when it was found that the southern abutment would block the River Effra, which by this time had been diverted underground to serve as a storm relief sewer and which flowed into the Thames at this point. The Effra had to be rerouted to join the Thames to the north of the bridge. After the construction of the foundations and piers it was then discovered that the clay of the riverbed at this point would not be able to support the weight of a concrete bridge.

The new bridge was eventually opened on 26 May 1906, five years behind schedule, in a ceremony presided over by the Prince of Wales and Evan Spicer, Chairman of the LCC. Charles Wall, who had won the contract to build the superstructure of the new bridge, paid the LCC £50 for the temporary wooden bridge, comprising  of timber and 580 tons of scrap metal.

Sculpture

The new bridge was built to a starkly functional design, and many influential architects had complained about the lack of consultation from any architects during the design process by the engineers designing the new bridge. In 1903, during the construction of the bridge, the LCC consulted with architect William Edward Riley regarding possible decorative elements that could be added to the bridge. Riley proposed erecting two  pylons topped with statues at one end of the bridge, and adding decorative sculpture to the bridge piers. The pylons were rejected on grounds of cost, but following further consultation with leading architect Richard Norman Shaw it was decided to erect monumental bronze statues above the piers, and Alfred Drury, George Frampton and Frederick Pomeroy were appointed to design appropriate statues.

Frampton resigned from the project through pressure of work, and Drury and Pomeroy carried out the project, each contributing four monumental statues, which were installed in late 1907. On the upstream piers are Pomeroy's Agriculture, Architecture, Engineering and Pottery, whilst on the downstream piers are Drury's Science, Fine Arts, Local Government and Education. Each statue weighs approximately two tons. Despite their size, the statues are little-noticed by users of the bridge as they are not visible from the bridge itself, but only from the river banks or from passing shipping.

Usage 
The new bridge soon became a major transport artery and today carries the A202 and Cycle Superhighway 5 across the Thames. Originally built with tram tracks, New Vauxhall Bridge was the first in central London to carry trams. Initially it carried horse-drawn trams, but shortly after the bridge's opening it was converted to carry the electric trams of London County Council Tramways; it continued to carry trams until the ending of tram services in 1951. In 1968 Vauxhall Bridge and Park Lane became the first roads in London to have bus lanes; during weekday evening rush hours, the central lane of the bridge was reserved for southbound buses only.

Millbank Bridge
Millbank Bridge was built of steel girders supported by wooden stakes; however, despite its flimsy appearance it was a sturdy structure, capable of supporting tanks and other heavy military equipment. In the event, Vauxhall Bridge survived the war undamaged, and in 1948 Millbank Bridge was dismantled. Its girders were shipped to Northern Rhodesia and used to span a tributary of the Zambezi.

The Crystal Span
In 1963 the Glass Age Development Committee commissioned a design for a replacement bridge at Vauxhall, inspired by the design of the Crystal Palace, to be called the Crystal Span. The Crystal Span was to have been a seven-story building supported by two piers in the river, overhanging the river banks at either end. The structure itself would have been enclosed in an air conditioned glass shell. The lowest floor would have contained two three-lane carriageways for vehicles, with a layer of shops and a skating rink in the centre of the upper floors. The southern end of the upper floors was to house a luxury hotel, whilst the northern end was to house the modern art collection of the nearby Tate Gallery, which at this time was suffering from a severe shortage of display space. The roof was to have housed a series of roof gardens, observation platforms and courtyards, surrounding a large open-air theatre. Despite much public interest in the proposals, the London County Council was reluctant to pay the estimated £7 million (£ in ) construction costs, and the scheme was abandoned.

Recent history
In 1993, a remnant of the earliest known bridge-like structure in London was discovered alongside Vauxhall Bridge, when shifting currents washed away a layer of silt which had covered it. Dating to between 1550 BC and 300 BC, it consists of two rows of wooden posts, which it is believed would originally have carried a deck of some kind. It is believed that it did not cross the whole river, but instead connected the south bank to an island, possibly used for burial of the dead. As no mention of this or similar structures in the area is made in Julius Caesar's account of crossing the Thames nor by any other Roman author, it is presumed that the structure had been dismantled or destroyed prior to Caesar's expedition to Britain in 55 BC. The posts are still visible at extreme low tides.

Following the closure of a number of the area's industries, in the 1970s and 1980s the land at the southern end of Vauxhall Bridge remained empty, following the failures of multiple redevelopment schemes. The most notable came in 1979 when Keith Wickenden MP, owner of the land at the immediate southern end of the bridge, proposed a large-scale redevelopment of the site. The development was to contain  of office space, 100 luxury flats and a gallery to house the Tate Gallery's modern art collection. The offices were to be housed in a  tower of green glass, which was nicknamed the "Green Giant" and met with much opposition. The then Secretary of State for the Environment, Michael Heseltine, refused permission for the development and the site remained empty.

In 1988 Regalian Properties purchased the site, and appointed Terry Farrell as architect. Farrell designed a self-contained community of shops, housing, offices and public spaces for the site. Regalian disliked the proposals and requested Farrell design a single large office block. Despite containing 50% more office space than the rejected Green Giant proposal, the design was accepted. The government then bought the site and design as a future headquarters for the Secret Intelligence Service, and the design was accordingly modified to increase security. In 1995 the SIS Building was opened on the site, and today dominates other buildings in the vicinity of the bridge.

In 2004 the Vauxhall Cross area at the southern end of the bridge was redeveloped as a major transport interchange, combining a large bus station with the existing National Rail and London Underground stations at Vauxhall. Immediately to the east of the southern end of the bridge, a slipway provides access for amphibious buses between the road and river.

The only significant alteration to the structure of the bridge itself since the addition of the sculptures in 1907 came in 1973, when the Greater London Council (GLC) decided to add an extra traffic lane by reducing the width of the pavements. To counter the increased load of extra traffic, the council announced the replacement of the cast-iron balustrades with low box-girder structures. Despite formal objections from both Lambeth and Westminster Councils, the GLC ignored the objections. In 2015, the extra lane of motor traffic was removed in favour of a kerb-protected two-way cycle track, on the north-east side of the bridge. This forms part of Cycle Superhighway 5.

The bridge was declared a Grade II* listed structure in 2008, providing protection to preserve its character from alteration.

See also
List of crossings of the River Thames
List of bridges in London

Notes and references

Notes

References

Bibliography

Bridges across the River Thames
Transport in the City of Westminster
Transport in the London Borough of Lambeth
Grade II* listed bridges in London
Grade II* listed buildings in the London Borough of Lambeth
History of the London Borough of Lambeth
Grade II* listed buildings in the City of Westminster
Bridges completed in 1816
Bridges completed in 1906
Rebuilt buildings and structures in the United Kingdom
Deck arch bridges
Steel bridges in the United Kingdom
Former toll bridges in England
1816 establishments in England
Bridges in London
Bridge light displays